Problem Solvers may refer to:
 The Problem Solverz, an animated television series aired on Cartoon Network
 "The Problem Solvers", an episode of sitcom 30 Rock

See also
 Problem solving